Exotica is the first album by Martin Denny, released in 1957. It contained Les Baxter's most famous piece, "Quiet Village", and spawned an entire genre bearing its name. It was recorded December 1956 in Webley Edwards' studio in Waikiki (not, as often reported, the Aluminum Dome at Henry J. Kaiser's Hawaiian Village Complex). The album topped Billboard's charts in 1959.

The album was recorded in mono. It was re-recorded in stereo in 1958; by then, however, Denny's sideman Arthur Lyman had left the group, and was replaced by Julius Wechter. Denny preferred the original mono version: "It has the original spark, the excitement, the feeling we were breaking new ground."

Track listing
 "Quiet Village" (Les Baxter) – 3:39
 "Return to Paradise" (Dimitri Tiomkin, Ned Washington) – 2:19
 "Hong Kong Blues" (Hoagy Carmichael) – 2:15
 "Busy Port" (Baxter) – 2:50
 "Lotus Land" (Cyril Scott) – 2:22
 "Similau" (Arden Clar, Harry Coleman) – 1:57
 "Stone God" (Baxter) – 3:07
 "Jungle Flower" (Baxter) – 1:46
 "China Nights" (Shina No Yoru) (Nobuyuki Takeoka) – 2:01
 "Ah Me Furi" (Gil Baumgart) – 2:08
 "Waipio" (Francis Brown) – 3:11
 "Love Dance" (Baxter) – 2:29

Personnel
 Martin Denny – piano, arrangements
 Arthur Lyman – vibes, xylophone, percussion
 John Kramer – string bass
 Augie Colon – bongos, congas, Latin effects, bird calls
 Harold Chang – drums, percussion
 Bob Lang – engineer
 Sandy Warner – cover model

References

1957 debut albums
Exotica albums
Martin Denny albums
Liberty Records albums
Albums produced by Martin Denny
Albums arranged by Martin Denny